John Bailey Ober (born July 12, 1995) is an American professional baseball pitcher for the Minnesota Twins of Major League Baseball (MLB).

Amateur career
Ober attended Charlotte Christian School in Charlotte, North Carolina and played college baseball at the College of Charleston. He was drafted by the Los Angeles Dodgers in the 23rd round of the 2016 MLB draft, but did not sign and returned to Charleston. He was then drafted by the Minnesota Twins in the 12th round of the 2017 MLB draft and signed.

Professional career
Ober made his professional debut in 2017 with the rookie ball Elizabethton Twins, recording a 3.21 ERA in 6 games. In 2018, Ober posted a 7-1 record and 3.84 ERA in 14 appearances for the Single-A Cedar Rapids Kernels. He split the 2019 season between the Double-A Pensacola Blue Wahoos and the High-A Fort Myers Miracle, pitching to a stellar 8-0 record and 0.69 ERA in 14 games.

Ober did not play in a game in 2020 due to the cancellation of the minor league season because of the COVID-19 pandemic. The Twins added Ober to their 40-man roster after the 2020 season. He was assigned to the Triple-A St. Paul Saints to begin the 2021 season.

On May 18, 2021, Ober was promoted to the major leagues for the first time. He made his MLB debut that day as the starting pitcher against the Chicago White Sox.

Personal life
Ober and his wife, Montana, married in 2017. They have one son and one daughter together.

References

External links

1995 births
Living people
People from Huntersville, North Carolina
Baseball players from North Carolina
Major League Baseball pitchers
Minnesota Twins players
College of Charleston Cougars baseball players
Elizabethton Twins players
Cedar Rapids Kernels players
Gulf Coast Twins players
Fort Myers Miracle players
Pensacola Blue Wahoos players
St. Paul Saints players